The Journal of Business Forecasting is a quarterly peer-reviewed academic journal covering business forecasting that is published by the Institute of Business Forecasting & Planning. It was established in 1982.

See also 
 Journal of Forecasting
 International Journal of Forecasting
 Foresight: The International Journal of Applied Forecasting

References

External links

Business and management journals
Academic journals published by learned and professional societies
Publications established in 1982
English-language journals
Quarterly journals